Ensemble 96 is a Norwegian chamber choir located in Oslo. The choir works mainly with contemporary music and is partly funded by government grants. It has released several CDs, and given concerts and participated in national and international choral competitions. Ensemble 96 has just under 30 members. 

Ensemble 96 was founded in 1996, and had its beginnings in the (now defunct) Oslo Philharmonic Chamber Choir.

The current conductor is Nina T. Karlsen. The founding conductor was Øystein Fevang. 

Ensemble 96's CD "Immortal Nystedt", published on the label 2L, was nominated for the 49th Grammy Awards in the categories Best Choral Performance and Best Surround Album.  The choir was awarded The Norwegian Choir Association's Choral Award for 2007.

First productions and commissioned works
 Antonio Bibalo: Psalm 8, November 2006
 Jon Balke: Palabras sueltas, Kongsberg Jazz Festival 2006
 Kjell Mørk Karlsen: O magnum mysterium, 2005
 Synne Skouen: En spøk (In Jest), 2005
 Knut Nystedt: Jesu Sieben Worte, 2003
 Stephen Frost: Parapraxis, in cooperation with Norwegian bassoonist Sigyn Birkeland, 2003
 Wolfgang Plagge: Salve Crux, 2002
 Wolfgang Plagge: Psalm 84, 2001
 Trond Lindheim: wedding cantata Hjelp, de gifter seg! (Oh my, they are getting married!) on the Norwegian national broadcasting company (NRK TV) during the wedding of Crown Prince Haakon and Miss Mette-Marit Tjessem Høiby in 2001
 Wolfgang Plagge: Liknarbraut, 2000
 Ketil Bjørnstad: Old, in cooperation with Jai Shankar, Palle Mikkelborg, Helen Davies and Ketil Bjørnstad, Vestfold International Festival 2000

Recordings
 "Kind" - 2L 2010 - Works by Marcus Paus, amongst others 
 Immortal Nystedt - 2L 2005 - Works by Knut Nystedt 
 Liknarbraut - 2L 2002 - Work by Wolfgang Plagge 
 Old – Universal 2001 - Ketil Bjørnstad
 Christmas album Det lyser i stille grender - Naxos 1998

References

External links
 Ensemble 96
 
 

Norwegian choirs
Chamber choirs
Musical groups established in 1996
1996 establishments in Norway
Musical groups from Oslo